Hong Kong Gold Coast is a private housing estate served by Castle Peak Road, near Castle Peak Bay, in So Kwun Wat, Tuen Mun, New Territories, Hong Kong. Developed by Sino Group, it includes 20 residential buildings completed in two phases (in 1990 and 1993 respectively), a resort hotel, a shopping mall, a yacht and country club, a marina and a beach.

History
The site of approximately 100 acres was purchased by Sino in the early 1980s. The first residential phase, comprising five 28-storey blocks, was completed in 1990. The hotel opened in 1993.

The Environmental Protection Department fined Sino Estate Management several times for causing pollution, as the sewage treatment plant at Gold Coast was too small and could not treat the sewage generated to the required standard. The company received a fine of $15 million in March 1993, $5,000 in early 1994, and two fines of $100,000 in 1995.

Features
Hong Kong Gold Coast is the largest tourist resort in Tuen Mun. Its facilities include the Hong Kong Gold Coast Hotel, a convention centre, a shopping mall, a marina club, the Golden Beach and the newly constructed Hong Kong Gold Coast Dolphin Square.

The Golden Beach is the largest public beach in Tuen Mun and the first artificial beach in Hong Kong. Tropical trees, like coconut, and flowers of various species are planted on both sides of a 480-metre long promenade running parallel to it.

Education
Gold Coast is in Primary One Admission (POA) School Net 71. Within the school net are multiple aided schools (operated independently but funded with government money); no government schools are in the school net.

Covid Pandemic
Tower 9 of Gold Coast Phase II was put under lockdown between 6 & 7 February 2021.

References

External links

Official website of Hong Kong Gold Coast

So Kwun Wat
Sino Group
Private housing estates in Hong Kong
Buildings and structures completed in 1990
Residential buildings completed in 1993